Michael John "Red" Wallace (July 12, 1918 – July 7, 1977) was an American professional basketball player. He played for the Boston Celtics during the 1946–47 Basketball Association of America season, the first in the league's existence, before he was traded to the Toronto Huskies for Charlie Hoefer. He also played for various teams in the American Basketball League prior to his stint in the BAA.

In college, Wallace played for two seasons at Keystone College, which at the time was a junior college, before finishing his career at the University of Scranton. In his post-playing career, Wallace coached teams in the Eastern Professional Basketball League, winning the league championship in 1958–59 with the Wilkes-Barre Barons. He also coached the Elk Lake (Pa.) High School boys' basketball team and won two state championships.

BAA career statistics

Regular season

References

1918 births
1977 deaths
American expatriate basketball people in Canada
American men's basketball players
Basketball coaches from Pennsylvania
Basketball players from Pennsylvania
Boston Celtics players
Continental Basketball Association coaches
Guards (basketball)
High school basketball coaches in the United States
Junior college football players in the United States
Junior college men's basketball players in the United States
Keystone College alumni
Paterson Crescents players
People from Lackawanna County, Pennsylvania
Scranton Royals men's basketball players
Toronto Huskies players
Wilkes-Barre Barons players